John Dolinsky is a retired German-American soccer player who played professionally in the Major Indoor Soccer League, American Soccer League, United Soccer League and American Indoor Soccer Association.  He also coached in the American Indoor Soccer Association where he was the 1989 Coach of the Year.

Player

College
Born in West Germany, Dolinsky grew up in Chicago, Illinois.  He attended Lewis University where from 1972 to 1975 he was a four year starter on the men's soccer team. He was a 1973 and 1974 Honorable Mention (third team) All American.  He finished his collegiate career with 51 goals and 32 assists.  Lewis University inducted Dolinsky into the school's Athletic Hall of Fame in 1985.  He did not complete his degree before turning professional and returned to school in 1991.

Professional
In 1976, Dolinsky began his professional career with the Chicago Cats of the American Soccer League.  In 1978, he played for the Indianapolis Daredevils, also of the ASL.  That fall, he began his indoor career with the Pittsburgh Spirit of Major Indoor Soccer League.  In 1980, the Spirit traded Dolinsky to the Buffalo Stallions.  He began the 1981–1982 season with the Stallions, but was traded to the Kansas City Comets during the season.  The Comets released him at the end of the season. In 1981, he played for the Rochester Flash of the American Soccer League.  He was a first team All Star that season.  In 1982, he moved to the Oklahoma City Slickers.  In April 1983, he signed with the Dallas Americans.  He continued to play for the Americans in 1984 when they played in the United Soccer League.  In the fall of 1984, he signed with the Canton Invaders of the American Indoor Soccer Association.  He played two seasons with the Invaders, winning the 1985 and 1986 titles before moving to the Milwaukee Wave in 1986.  He returned to outdoor soccer in the summer of 1985 as a player/coach with the Tulsa Tornados of the USL.  After the USL collapsed six games into the season, Dolinsky moved to Chicago where he played for Chicago Schwaben. He signed with the Milwaukee Wave in 1986 and played two seasons before retiring as a player.

Coach
In January 1987, the Milwaukee Wave elevated Dolinsky to the position of player/coach.  He coached the Wave through the 1989–1990 season.  He was the 1989 AISA Coach of the Year.  The Wave fired Dolinsky in June 1990.  In February 1991, the Dayton Dynamo hired Dolinsky to coach the team for the remainder of the season.  In the fall of 1991, he left the Dynamo to return to school, but came back in January 1992 to coach the team.  He resigned a month later.  In 1995, he became an assistant coach with the Chicago Power.  In 2004, he briefly coached the Indiana Blast of the fourth division Premier Development League. 

Dolinsky currently serves as a Staff Coach for the Chicago Fire Academy.

Yearly Awards
ASL All-Star Team: 1981
AISA Coach of the Year: 1989

References

1954 births
American Indoor Soccer Association coaches
American Indoor Soccer Association players
American soccer players
American Soccer League (1933–1983) players
Buffalo Stallions players
Canton Invaders players
Chicago Cats players
Chicago Schwaben players
Dallas Americans players
German emigrants to the United States
Indianapolis Daredevils players
Kansas City Comets (original MISL) players
Major Indoor Soccer League (1978–1992) players
Milwaukee Wave players
National Professional Soccer League (1984–2001) coaches
Oklahoma City Slickers (ASL) players
Pittsburgh Spirit players
Rochester Flash players
Tulsa Tornados players
United Soccer League (1984–85) coaches
United Soccer League (1984–85) players
Living people
Chicago Fire FC non-playing staff
Association football defenders
Association football midfielders
Soccer players from Chicago
Sportspeople from Chicago
American soccer coaches
USL League Two coaches
Lewis Flyers athletes
Player-coaches